This is a list of festivals in Winnipeg, Manitoba, Canada.  This list includes festivals of diverse types, such as regional festivals, commerce festivals, fairs, food festivals, arts festivals, religious festivals, folk festivals, and recurring festivals on holidays. The city hosts several large festivals each year including Winnipeg Folk Festival, Winnipeg Jazz Festival, and Winnipeg Fringe Theatre Festival.

Arts festivals 

Dance Manitoba Festival
Winnipeg International Burlesque Festival
 Winnipeg Crankie Festival

Art festivals 

 Manitoba Fibre Festival
 Nuit Blanche Winnipeg
 Wall-to-Wall Mural & Culture Festival
 Winnipeg Design Festival

Comedy festivals
Winnipeg Comedy Festival
Winnipeg Improv Festival

Film festivals 
Architecture+Design Film Festival
Canadian International Comedy Film Festival
Cinémental
FascinAsian Film Festival
Freeze Frame International Film Festival
L'Alliance Française French Film Festival
Gimme Some Truth Documentary Festival
Reel Pride
Winnipeg Aboriginal Film Festival
Winnipeg International Jewish Film Festival
Winnipeg Reel to Reel Film Festival
WNDX Festival of Moving Image

Literary festivals
Winnipeg International Storytelling Festival
Winnipeg International Writers Festival

Music festivals
Aggasiz Chamber Music Festival
Big Fun Festival
ChoralFest Manitoba
Cluster: New Music + Integrated Arts Festival
Community Bands Festival
Fire & Water Music Festival
Jazz Winnipeg Festival
Manito Ahbee Festival
Manitoba Electronic Music Exhibition
Manitoba MetalFest
Matlock Festival of Music, Art and Nature
Northern Touch Music Festival
Optimist Concert & Jazz Band Festival
Soca Reggae Festival
Solo & Ensemble Festival
Summer of Sound
Together Again
Winnipeg Folk Festival
Winnipeg New Music Festival

Theatre and stage festivals 

 FemFest
 Manitoba Drama Youth Festival
 Royal MTC Master Playwright Festival (2001-2021)
 Winnipeg Improv Festival
 Winnipeg Fringe Theatre Festival

Other festivals
Canad Inns Winter Wonderland
CURRENT Winnipeg
Doors Open Winnipeg
Dragon Boat Festival
Festival of Fools
Keep the Fires Burning
Manitoba Liquor & Lotteries ManyFest
MayWorks Festival of Labour and the Arts
Pride Winnipeg
Red River Exhibition
Rodarama
Science Rendezvous Winnipeg
Spur Winnipeg
Summer Entertainment Series at Assiniboine Park
Teddy Bears' Picnic
Winnipeg Fish Festival
Children's festivals
Winnipeg International Children's Festival (KidsFest)

Cultural festivals
Aboriginal Day Live & Festival
Asian Canadian Festival
Canada's National Ukrainian Festival
Culture Days
Festival du Voyageur
Folklorama
Manitoba Ukrainian Dance Festival
Polish Fest
Tarbut: Festival of Jewish Culture
Winnipeg Chinatown Street Festival
Winnipeg Irish Festival
Winnipeg Scottish Festival

Food & beverage festivals
Flatlander's Beer Festival
Rotary RibFest
Winnipeg Whiskey Festival
Winnipeg Wine Festival

Pop culture festivals
Ai-Kon - Anime convention
Central Canada Comic Con
Manitoba Comic & Sci-Fi Expo
Winnipeg Comic & Toy Expo

References 

Festivals